Les McKay (27 May 1917 – 22 March 1981) was an Australian water polo player. He competed in the men's tournament at the 1948 Summer Olympics.

He was given the honour to carry the national flag of Australia at the opening ceremony of the 1948 Summer Olympics in London, becoming the fifth water polo player to be a flag bearer at the opening and closing ceremonies of the Olympics.

See also
 Australia men's Olympic water polo team records and statistics

References

External links
 

1917 births
1981 deaths
Australian male water polo players
Olympic water polo players of Australia
Water polo players at the 1948 Summer Olympics
Water polo players from Sydney